Carlos Varela may refer to:

 Carlos Varela (singer-songwriter) (born 1963), singer-songwriter of nueva trova from Havana, Cuba
 Carlos Varela (bandleader), Cuban bandleader of the 1940s-era Orquestra Havana-Madrid
 Carlos Muñiz Varela (1953–1979), Cuban resident of Puerto Rico who was murdered under suspicious circumstances in 1979
 Carlos Varela (Spanish footballer) (born 1977), Spanish footballer
 Carlos Varela (Chilean footballer) (1918–1964) 
 Carlos Varela (wrestler) (born 1966), wrestler from Cuba
 Carlos Mendes Varela (born 1984), Portuguese-born French rugby league player